Duhri  is a village in the municipality of Kiseljak, Bosnia and Herzegovina.

History 
Duhri, as well as the nearby village of Han Ploča, were on the eastern front of the Croatian Republic of Herzeg-Bosnia against the Republic of Bosnia and Herzegovina as well as the Serbian Republic during the Bosnian War. The strategic importance of the area lengthened communication lines of the Army of the Republic of Bosnia and Herzegovina (ARBiH). As a precautionary measure against the ARBiH offensive against Croatian-held territories, the Croatian Defence Council (HVO), the armed forces of Herzeg-Bosnia, disarmed the Muslims in the area in August, 1992. Later, on the orders of Colonel Blaskic, their weapons were returned so that they could defend themselves from the Serbs. On April 22–23, the Muslims in Duhri once again surrendered their weapons to the HVO while those in Han Ploča refused to do so.

Demographics 
According to the 2013 census, its population was 300.

References

Populated places in Kiseljak